Fabien Giroix (born 17 September 1960) is a French racing driver from Saint-Maur-des-Fossés, Paris.

Racing career

Formula cars
Giroix began his career in French Formula Renault in 1984, finishing 4th. In 1985 he drove in the French Formula Three Championship and finished 12th. In 1986 he only participated in a handful of Formula 3 races in the British and German series. In 1987 he drove in two major F3 races (Monaco and Macau) and made his World Touring Car Championship and made his DTM debut in an Alpina BMW M3. In 1988 he drove in the first five races of the International Formula 3000 season for Sport Auto Racing, starting second and finishing fourth in his first start at Circuito de Jerez. The points from that race were good enough for 17th in the championship.

Touring cars
In 1989 Giroix joined the DTM circuit full-time driving a BMW M3 for Schnitzer Motorsport, finishing 3rd in points with 10 podium finishes in 21 starts. He also drove in the 24 Hours of Nürburgring and with teammates Emanuele Pirro and Roberto Ravaglia won the race in their Team Bigazzi BMW M3. In 1990 he dropped to 9th in points for the same team but won the Spa 24 Hours with teammates Johnny Cecotto and Markus Oestreich. In 1991 he made ten starts for Zakspeed in their Mercedes 190E Evo, finishing 23rd in points.

In 1992 Giroix drove in the French Supertouring Championship in a Garage du BAC BMW M3 and finished 4th in points. In 1993 he got a factory drive in a Seat Toledo for 7 races and finished 16th in points. He also finished 3rd in the Porsche Carrera Cup France. In 1993 he returned to the Seat factory team full-time in French Supertouring and finished 11th as well as finishing 6th in French Carrera Cup.

Sports cars
In 1995 Giroix moved to high-level sports car racing with his own Giroix Racing Team that campaigned a McLaren F1 GTR in the BPR Global GT Series where he finished on the podium twice in five starts and competed in his first 24 Hours of Le Mans where his team finished 5th overall and 4th in class in a race uncharacteristically dominated by GT1-class McLaren F1 GTR's. In 1996 he split his time in Global GT between his own GTR and a factory Lotus Esprit. The Giroix McLaren F1 GTR failed to finish at Le Mans in 1996. In 1997 Giroix's team became the factory-backed outfit for the Lotus Elise GT1 in the FIA GT Championship but the season was not successful. In 1998 he only made one start in a Zakspeed Porsche 911 in FIA GT. Giroix drove in a handful of sports car races throughout most of the 2000s before resurfacing in the Speedcar Series in 2008 where he competed in all 8 races and finished 10th in points. As of 2010 he remains an active driver, having made four starts in a Lamborghini Gallardo in the French GT Championship.

Racing record

Complete Deutsche Tourenwagen Meisterschaft results
(key) (Races in bold indicate pole position) (Races in italics indicate fastest lap)

Complete International Formula 3000 results
(key) (Races in bold indicate pole position; races in italics indicate fastest lap.)

24 Hours of Le Mans results

Complete FIA GT Championship results
(key) (Races in bold indicate pole position) (Races in italics indicate fastest lap)

Complete GT1 World Championship results

Complete FIA World Endurance Championship results
(key) (Races in bold indicate pole position; races in italics indicate fastest lap)

Complete WeatherTech SportsCar Championship results
(key) (Races in bold indicate pole position) (Races in italics indicate fastest lap)

References

External links
Photos of Giroix's racecars from Racing Sports Cars

French racing drivers
French Formula Renault 2.0 drivers
French Formula Three Championship drivers
German Formula Three Championship drivers
British Formula Three Championship drivers
International Formula 3000 drivers
Deutsche Tourenwagen Masters drivers
FIA GT Championship drivers
24 Hours of Le Mans drivers
Speedcar Series drivers
Living people
American Le Mans Series drivers
FIA GT1 World Championship drivers
European Le Mans Series drivers
1960 births
Sportspeople from Saint-Maur-des-Fossés
Porsche Supercup drivers
FIA World Endurance Championship drivers
Blancpain Endurance Series drivers
24 Hours of Daytona drivers
WeatherTech SportsCar Championship drivers
24 Hours of Spa drivers
Action Express Racing drivers
Alan Docking Racing drivers
Schnitzer Motorsport drivers
BMW M drivers
David Price Racing drivers
Nürburgring 24 Hours drivers